Mount Loretto Unique Area is an open space reserve and nature preserve administered by the New York State Department of Environmental Conservation on the South Shore of Staten Island, New York City.

History

Mount Loretto was once the largest orphanage in New York State. It was started by Father John Christopher Drumgoole, an Irish Catholic priest and founder of the Mission of the Immaculate Virgin in Manhattan, an organization to help poor and disposed children. He purchased the Staten Island land for the orphanage in the 1890s and named it "Mount Loretto" in honor of one of the nuns who worked with him at the mission. It was served by the Mount Loretto Spur of the Staten Island Railway.

The area that encompasses the Mount Loretto Unique Area was purchased from the Archdiocese of New York by the New York State Department of Environmental Conservation in 1999. The property formerly contained various buildings including the St. Elisabeth's girls' dormitory, a large Victorian Era building which was destroyed by arson during the time title to the land was being transferred to the state.

Geography and natural history
The bluffs are part of a terminal moraine (deposits of clay and gravel deposited during periods of glaciation); they are remnants left by the Wisconsin Glacier, which reached its southernmost terminus in Staten Island. The highest bluff is the location of an historic lighthouse the Princes Bay Light. The stone lighthouse, which was built in 1864 with an attached lighthouse keeper's cottage built in 1868, is a New York State Landmark.

Within the preserve, in addition to the bluffs, there are extensive brackish and freshwater wetlands including a large vernal pond. The preserve contains a wide variety of native plants, shrubs, and trees, owing to the diverse habitats represented within the park.

There are various species of birds which frequent the park during various parts of the year. Its large mowed fields make it attractive to many species of upland shorebird such as buff-breasted sandpiper and upland sandpiper. Other field birds, such as eastern meadowlark and bobolink, can also be found here during migration. The wetlands areas support habitat utilized by various species of waterfowl such as the wood duck (Aix sponsa), blue and green-winged teal, as well many many species of ducks, waders and marsh birds. Many rare birds have visited the preserve including white ibis, scissor-tailed flycatcher and western kingbird. The preserve is also home to snakes, turtles, frogs and toads, as well as raccoons, chipmunks, moles and field mice.

References

External links

 NYS Department of Environmental Conservation: Mount Loretto Unique Area

Protected areas of Staten Island
Nature reserves in New York (state)
New York (state) unique areas
Regional parks in the United States
Protected areas established in 1999
1999 establishments in New York City